Bank Pembangunan Malaysia Berhad (BPMB; English: Malaysia Development Bank Limited, formerly known as Bank Pembangunan dan Infrastruktur Malaysia or Malaysia Infrastructure and Development Bank), also known simply as Bank Pembangunan is a development bank in Malaysia. The bank's activities are to provide medium to long-term financing to capital-intensive industries, which include infrastructure projects, maritime and high technology sectors and making a number of strategic investments. It is owned by the Minister of Finance Incorporated.

Established under the Malaysia's Companies Act 1965 on 28 November 1973, their initial objective was to assist entrepreneurs involved in small and medium-sized industries through the provision of various financing facilities, training and entrepreneurial advisory services. In addition to providing direct financing, Bank Pembangunan through its subsidiaries and associated companies facilitates the growth of Malaysia's strategic economic sector.

In 2019, Bank Pembangunan and Danajamin receive approval from Bank Negara Malaysia on account of merger plans.

In 2020, the bank was one of list of banks to provide assistance to customers whose business operations affected by the COVID-19 pandemic.

See also
 List of banks in Malaysia

Notes

References

External links
 

Banks of Malaysia
Banks established in 1973
Companies based in Kuala Lumpur
Minister of Finance (Incorporated) (Malaysia)
Malaysian companies established in 1973
1973 establishments in Malaysia